Pregnant with Success is the debut studio album by American rapper Junglepussy. It was released on November 17, 2015. It is a follow-up to her 2014 mixtape, Satisfaction Guaranteed. The production was handled by Shy Guy, Cousin Gabriel, Matt Parad, and Dubbel Dutch.

Junglepussy described it as "an ode to my mother, to all mothers, to anyone who's ever planted a seed, to anyone who's ever created something, to anyone who's ever waited patiently for something to come into fruition."

Critical reception

Anupa Mistry of Pitchfork gave the album a 7.5 out of 10, calling it "another reminder of how humor can bring the audience closer and form an emotional connection." She compared the album to Paul Beatty's 2015 novel The Sellout, saying, "It's as bright as Beatty's novel is dark, but they're both charmingly demented, sharp-witted, and necessary social critiques."

Accolades

Track listing

References

External links
 
 

2015 albums
Hip hop albums by American artists